is a Japanese short CG anime series by Sanzigen, based on a short journal column created by Supercell member Yoshiki Usa and illustrator Tomoko Fujinoki. The series aired on TV Tokyo between October and December 2012, and was streamed on Nico Nico Douga and Crunchyroll. A second season began airing in January 2014 and ended on March 25, 2014. A third season began airing on July 3, 2015, and ended on September 25, 2015.

Characters

A mysterious yellow rabbit-like animal who lives on the internet. He has three dots on his face, representing his eyes (outer two dots) and nose (center dot). He loves money, meat, girls and girls' school uniforms, and hides this corrupt personality with his cute appearance.

A sensible brown-haired girl whose house Wooser likes to freeload in.

Rin's precocious twin sister who has black hair.

A mysterious black robot that Wooser made resembling himself.

One of Rin and Len's classmates who wears twintails and a flower.

A white owl-like animal who is often seen with Yuu.

Another one of Rin and Len's classmates.

A raccoon who is often seen with Miho.

Anime
The first series aired in Japan between October 3 and December 19, 2012. Crunchyroll began streaming the series from December 11, 2012.
The series was released on Blu-ray Disc and DVD on March 22, 2013, with an original video animation episode included on the BD release.

A second season, titled , began airing from January 7, 2014, to March 25, 2014. A third season began airing from July 3, 2015, to September 25, 2015 (with each episode at almost eight minutes as opposed to the original four).

Episode list

Season 1

Season 2

Season 3

References

External links
Official website 
Official anime website 
Wooser at Nico Nico Douga 

2012 anime television series debuts
Sanzigen
Films with screenplays by Makoto Uezu
TV Tokyo original programming